, , or , otherwise known as  by speakers of the dialect, is a dialect of Korean spoken by the Koryo-saram, ethnic Koreans in the countries of the former Soviet Union. It is descended from the Hamgyŏng dialect and multiple other varieties of Northeastern Korean. Koryo-mar is often reported as difficult to understand by speakers of standard Korean; this may be compounded by the fact that the majority of Koryo-saram today use Russian and not Korean as their first language.

According to German Kim, Koryo-mar is not widely used in the media and is not taught in schools. Thus it can be classified as endangered.

Names 

In South Korea, the dialect is referred to as Goryeomal or Central Asian Korean.

Orthography 
Speakers do not generally use Koryo-mar as a literary language. Written Korean during the Soviet period tended to follow the North Korean standard language, while both Northern and Southern forms have occurred after the dissolution of the Soviet Union. However, some modern writers, most notably Lavrenti Son, have created plays and short stories in Koryo-mar using Hangul.

A movement for the romanization of Koryo-mar took place in the late 1930s, promoted by various government officials and linguists, but it did not have much success.

Phonology
Characteristics of Koryo-mar distinct from that of Standard Korean include the following phonological differences:
 frequent loss of ㄹ before coronal consonants
 A pitch accent system that distinguishes minimal pairs; it has two tones, high and low
 the retention of MK initial n before  and 
 ㄱ is  before ㅣ
 ㄴ and ㅇ at the end of a word are simplified to 이
 ㅏ, ㅔ are pronounced as ㅑ; and ㅗ is pronounced as ㅔ
 ㅗ, ㅡ are simplified to ㅜ; and ㅣ is interchangeable with ㅡ
  is pronounced as  due to Russian influence
 ㅈ is pronounced as ㄷ
 ㄱ is pronounced as ㅂ in the middle of a word

Pedagogy 
Koryo-mar is not taught as a subject or used as the medium of instruction in any schools. Furthermore, due to the encouragement of younger generations to learn Russian the decline of Koryo-mar usage in families has also accelerated, with most Koryo-Saram (with the exception of the elderly) using Koryo-Mar words only when talking about food (especially Koryo-Saram cuisine) or possibly certain household items. The Korean language as taught in universities of the post-Soviet states is Standard Korean, with instructors being native to or trained. In one instance, a South Korean professor tried to teach Koryo-mar at Almaty State University, but he did not achieve much success.

However, despite the stark decline in the use of Koryo-mar, certain words, especially regarding food and household items, as well as familial titles to a certain extent have continued to be passed down to varying degrees to younger generations of Koryo-saram through exposure by older generations.

See also 

 Koreanic languages
 Cyrillization of Korean
 Korean dialects
 Yukjin dialect

References

Further reading 
 

Korean dialects
Languages of Kazakhstan
Languages of Kyrgyzstan
Languages of Russia
Languages of Uzbekistan